The Flint Six "55" Four Door Brougham was manufactured by Flint Motors Division of Flint, Michigan.

Flint Six "55" Four Door Brougham specifications (1926 data) 

 Color – Optional
 Seating Capacity – Five
 Wheelbase – 120 inches
 Wheels – Artillery
 Tires - 32" x 6.20" balloon
 Service Brakes – Hydraulic, expanding on four wheels
 Emergency Brakes – Contracting on rear
 Engine  - Eight-cylinder, vertical, cast en block, 3-3/8 x 5 inches; head removable; valves in side; H.P. 27.34 N.A.C.C. rating
 Lubrication – Force feed
 Crankshaft - Seven bearing
 Radiator – Cellular type
 Cooling – Centrifugal pump
 Ignition – Storage Battery
 Starting System – Two Unit
 Voltage – Six to eight
 Wiring System – Single
 Gasoline System – Vacuum
 Clutch – Single plate
 Transmission – Selective sliding
 Gear Changes – 3 forward, 1 reverse
 Drive – Spiral bevel
 Springs – Semi-elliptic
 Rear Axle – Semi-floating
 Steering Gear – Ross cam and lever

Standard equipment
New car price included the following items:
 tools
 jack
 speedometer
 ammeter
 motometer with lock
 electric horn
 transmission theft lock
 automatic windshield cleaner
 demountable rims
 stop light
 front bumper
 spare tire carrier
 rear-view mirror
 sun visor
 cowl ventilator
 headlight dimmer
 clock
 closed cars have heater and dome light.

Optional equipment
The following was available at an extra cost:
 extra tire
 tube
 rim
 tire cover
 gasoline gauge on dash

Prices
New car prices were F.O.B. factory, plus Tax:
 Five Passenger Touring - $1595
 Four Passenger Coupé - $2195
 Five Passenger Sedan - $2285
 Five Passenger Brougham - $2735
 Four Passenger Sport Roadster - $1950

See also
 Flint (automobile)

References
Source: 

Cars of the United States